Sümeyra Kaya-Yazıcı, née Kaya, is a European champion Turkish female boxer competing in the flyweight division. She is a member of the Fenerbahçe Boxing club in Istanbul, Turkey.

She was silver medalist at the 2005 Women's World Amateur Boxing Championships held in Podolsk, Russia. In 2007, she became European champion in Vejle, Denmark. In addition, she holds diverse medals in European and European Union championships.

Achievements
2004 Women's European Amateur Boxing Championships Riccione, Italy 52 kg - 
2005 Women's World Amateur Boxing Championships Podolsk, Russia 52 kg - 
2005 Women's European Amateur Boxing Championships Tønsberg, Norway 52 kg - 
2006 Women's European Amateur Boxing Championships Warsaw, Poland 52 kg - 
2006 Women's European Union Amateur Boxing Championships Porto Torres, Italy 52 kg - 
2007 Women's European Amateur Boxing Championships Vejle, Denmark 50 kg - 
2008 Women's European Union Amateur Boxing Championships Liverpool, England 50 kg - 
2009 Women's European Amateur Boxing Championships Mykolaiv, Ukraine 51 kg - 
2010 Women's European Union Amateur Boxing Championships Keszthely, Hungary 51 kg -

References

Turkish women boxers
Fenerbahçe boxers
Living people
Date of birth unknown
Flyweight boxers
European champions for Turkey
Year of birth missing (living people)
21st-century Turkish sportswomen